Maria Pallas (since 2021 Aasmets; born 13 January 1993) is an Estonian swimmer.

She was born in Tallinn. She is studying at University of Tartu.

She began her swimming career in 1999, coached by Viive Soll. 2008-2011 her coach was Urmas Jaamul. She is multiple-times Estonian champion in different swimming disciplines. 2009–2011 she was a member of Estonian national swimming team.

References

Living people
1993 births
Estonian female breaststroke swimmers
Estonian female butterfly swimmers
Estonian female freestyle swimmers
University of Tartu alumni
Swimmers from Tallinn
21st-century Estonian women